Ishrat Jahan Chaity is a Bangladeshi film actress.

Career
Chaity began her career in acting after winning the Lux Channel I Superstar in 2008. She played as lead cast member Sadharon Meye on 2009 television drama Rabindranath Tagore. After transitioning into film, she had her breakthrough role in Rabeya Khatun's drama-film Madhumati (2011), which was a huge success among critics.

Chaity made her film debut with Riaz in Madhumati (2011), a film produced by Impress Telefilms. Her next film, Lovely, earned her the Best Actress nomination at Meril Prothom Alo Awards.

Filmography
 Madhumati (2011)
 Lovely (2013)
 Mon Debo Mon Nebo (2018)
 Goendagiri (2019)

Television
 Mukim Brothers (2010)
 Shadharaon Meye (2019)
 Khelowar
 Moddhobortini

References

External links
 

Living people
Bangladeshi actresses
Bangladeshi film actresses
Year of birth missing (living people)
Place of birth missing (living people)